Steve Munro (born 11 June 1958) is a former Scotland international rugby union player. He played as a Wing.

Rugby Union career

Amateur career

Munro was described as a fast and powerful winger.

He played for Ayr. He was Scotland's leading try scorer in the 1978-79 season with 36 tries, all bar one try scored with Ayr.

He moved on to play for West of Scotland.

Provincial career

He played for Glasgow District. He played for Glasgow against New Zealand in 1979.

He played for Whites Trial side on 7 January 1984 in a 21 - 3 win.

He played for Combined Scottish Districts on 1 March 1986 against South of Scotland.

International career

He was first noticed by Scotland Schools and capped by them.

He was capped by Scotland 'B' to play Ireland 'B' on 1 December 1979 and played in the Scotland 'B' side against France 'B' in the spring of 1980.

He went on to receive 10 full senior caps for Scotland from 1980 to 1984. He scored two tries at Twickenham on 21 February 1981, although Scotland remained on the losing side. His last cap against France in 1984 came after an international absence of two years, but his performance for Whites Trial earlier that year ensured his selection.

References

1958 births
Living people
Ayr RFC players
Scotland 'B' international rugby union players
Scotland international rugby union players
Scottish rugby union players
West of Scotland FC players
Whites Trial players
Scottish Districts (combined) players